Brats of the Lost Nebula is a science fiction television series for kids. It combines puppetry and computer animation. The series follows five orphaned children from different war-torn planets. As they search for their surviving family members, they must also band together to fight an evil invading force known as "The Shock".

The series was created by Dan Clark, who was also an executive producer along with Brian Henson and Margaret Loesch. The puppet characters mixed both traditional hand puppetry and animatronics. These puppets were built by Jim Henson's Creature Shop. The computer graphics were created by C.O.R.E. Digital Effects.

In the United States, the series aired on The WB (during the Kids' WB block) in October 1998. It was removed from the channel after airing its third episode. The remaining episodes were shown on Canada's YTV channel.

The Brats
The Brats, sometimes referred to as orphans, each have a different set of skills in addition to their otherworldly uniqueness. After the escape of Zadam and Triply from the Shock attack on their home world, the five kids meet on a living planetoid to start their rebellion against The Shock and find their lost parents.

 Zadam (voiced by Kirby Morrow) – The 14-year-old leader of the Brats and Triply's older brother. He is from the planet Shirud.
 Triply (voiced by Annick Obonsawin) – Zadam's 10-year-old little sister. She is also from Shirud.
 Duncan (voiced by Glenn Cross) – A heavy, musclebound male with tinkering skills. He is from the planet Yarlon.
 Ryle (voiced by Evan Sabba) – A horned, blue-skinned male who is fiercely competitive. He is from the planet Tranoid.
 Lavana (voiced by Deborah Odell) – A winged elf with mystic abilities. She is from the planet Loza.

They are aided in their quest by a long-eared animal named Splook, who has a missile-laden suit of armor, and by SMARTS, the smartest computer in the universe. The Brats themselves ride into battle on modified space cruisers.

Episodes

Cast

Puppeteers
 Bill Barretta – 
 Matt Ficner – Mallosha, Zadam 
 John E. Kennedy – 
 Trish Leeper – 
 Sue Morrison – 
 Ian Petrella – 
 James Rankin – 
 Gordon Robertson – 
 Fred Stinson – 
 Jeff Sweeney – 
 Jean-Guy White – 
 Mak Wilson –

Voices
 Glenn Cross – Duncan
 Kirby Morrow – Zadam
 Annick Obonsawin – Triply
 Deborah Odell – Lavana
 Evan Sabba – Ryle
 James Rankin – High Commander Vigar
 Rob Smith – Blight

Broadcast
In the United States, the series premiered on the Kids' WB block on October 10, 1998. It was removed from the schedule after airing its third episode on October 24. At the time, a publicist from the WB network said, "We're trying to figure out what works best in our lineup and when. The show has not been cancelled. It should eventually return, we just don't know when and where." In Canada, all thirteen episodes aired on YTV from November 1998 onward. The last episode debuted January 20, 1999.

In April 2020, hundreds of hours of Jim Henson Company productions were released on Roku, including Brats of the Lost Nebula.

Unproduced follow-ups
In early 1999, a Playback article reported that "another thirteen [episodes] are on the way," but these new episodes were never produced. In September 2002, Kidscreen mentioned that the Dan Clark Company was "currently working on a Brats of the Lost Nebula direct-to-video title with Henson."

References

External links
 Brats of the Lost Nebula: Series Creator Dan Clark on YouTube
 
 
 Brats of the Lost Nebula at Muppet Wiki

Kids' WB original shows
The WB original programming
1998 American television series debuts
1999 American television series endings
1990s American children's television series
American children's action television series
American children's adventure television series
American children's science fiction television series
American television series with live action and animation
American television shows featuring puppetry
1998 Canadian television series debuts
1999 Canadian television series endings
1990s Canadian children's television series
Canadian children's action television series
Canadian children's adventure television series
Canadian children's science fiction television series
Canadian television series with live action and animation
Canadian television shows featuring puppetry
English-language television shows
Space adventure television series
Television series about orphans
Television series by DHX Media
Television series by The Jim Henson Company